Oiva Halmetoja (31 March 1920 – 21 February 2007) was a Finnish athlete. He competed in the men's hammer throw at the 1952 Summer Olympics.

References

External links
 

1920 births
2007 deaths
Athletes (track and field) at the 1952 Summer Olympics
Finnish male hammer throwers
Olympic athletes of Finland
People from Maaninka
Sportspeople from North Savo